Diocese of Banja Luka may refer to:

 Serbian Orthodox Diocese of Banja Luka, diocese (eparchy) of the Serbian Orthodox Church, in western part of Bosnia and Herzegovina.
 Roman Catholic Diocese of Banja Luka, diocese of the Catholic Church, in western part of Bosnia and Herzegovina.

See also
Banja Luka
Eastern Orthodoxy in Bosnia and Herzegovina
Catholic Church in Bosnia and Herzegovina
Diocese of Sarajevo (disambiguation)
Diocese of Trebinje (disambiguation)
Diocese of Mostar (disambiguation)